Champion Breweries PLC is a Nigerian brewing company located in Akwa Ibom state. The company is the producer of Champion lager beer and Champ Malta. 

Champion Breweries was established as a publicly funded commercial enterprise in 1974 and began manufacturing in 1976 with a capacity of 150,000 hecto litres of Champion beer and 10,000 hecto litres of Champ Malta. At formation, the firm patronized a plastic manufacturing company to produce crates for holdings the products instead of paper cartons, a precedent other beer producers later followed.

In 2014, Heineken International acquired a majority equity in the company.

References

Breweries in Nigeria
Akwa Ibom State